Huddersfield Town's 1932–33 campaign was a season of success under difficult circumstances for Huddersfield Town. With the previous season's top scorer Dave Mangnall missing for all but 3 matches of the season, their firepower was substantially weakened, the Terriers still managed to finish in 6th place, just 4 points behind 3rd placed Sheffield Wednesday.

Squad at the start of the season

Review
Following the previous season's 4th-place finish, many thought that the championship wasn't out of Town's reach, especially with 42-goal Dave Mangnall in their ranks. Unfortunately, Mangnall only managed to play 3 matches during the whole season. Other sources for goals needed to be found, but only George McLean scored more than 10 goals throughout the season. They still managed to finish 6th despite only scoring 66 goals, compared to the 118 scored by champions Arsenal.

Squad at the end of the season

Results

Division One

FA Cup

Appearances and goals

Huddersfield Town A.F.C. seasons
Huddersfield Town F.C.